Hampton Hawes Trio (subtitled Vol. 1) is the debut album by pianist Hampton Hawes recorded in 1955 and released on the Contemporary label.

Reception

The AllMusic review by Scott Yanow states: "In addition to three of his basic originals, Hawes performs fresh and swinging versions of seven standards, making such overplayed tunes such as 'I Got Rhythm,' 'What Is This Thing Called Love?,' and 'All the Things You Are' really come alive. A gem, the first of many classic Hawes dates on Contemporary".

Track listing
All compositions by Hampton Hawes except as indicated
 "I Got Rhythm" (George Gershwin, Ira Gershwin) – 3:19
 "What Is This Thing Called Love?" (Cole Porter) – 4:46
 "Blues the Most" – 5:45
 "So in Love" (Porter) – 3:58
 "Feelin' Fine" – 3:04
 "Hamp's Blues" – 3:42
 "Easy Living" (Ralph Rainger, Leo Robin) – 4:50
 "All the Things You Are" (Jerome Kern, Oscar Hammerstein II) – 4:59
 "These Foolish Things" (Holt Marvell, Harry Link, Jack Strachey) – 4:50
 "Carioca" (Vincent Youmans, Edward Eliscu, Gus Kahn) – 2:24

Personnel
Hampton Hawes – piano
Red Mitchell – bass (tracks 1–3 & 5–10)
Chuck Thompson – drums (tracks 1–3 & 5–10)

References

Contemporary Records albums
Hampton Hawes albums
1955 albums